Dolomite is an anhydrous carbonate mineral composed of calcium magnesium carbonate, ideally  The term is also used for a sedimentary carbonate rock composed mostly of the mineral dolomite.  An alternative name sometimes used for the dolomitic rock type is dolostone.

History

As stated by Nicolas-Théodore de Saussure the mineral dolomite was probably first described by Carl Linnaeus in 1768. In 1791, it was described as a rock by the French naturalist and geologist Déodat Gratet de Dolomieu (1750–1801), first in buildings of the old city of Rome, and later as samples collected in the Tyrolean Alps. Nicolas-Théodore de Saussure first named the mineral (after Dolomieu) in March 1792.

Properties
The mineral dolomite crystallizes in the trigonal-rhombohedral system. It forms white, tan, gray, or pink crystals. Dolomite is a double carbonate, having an alternating structural arrangement of calcium and magnesium ions. Unless it is in fine powder form, it does not rapidly dissolve or effervesce (fizz) in cold dilute hydrochloric acid as calcite does. Crystal twinning is common.

Solid solution exists between dolomite, the iron-dominant ankerite and the manganese-dominant kutnohorite. Small amounts of iron in the structure give the crystals a yellow to brown tint. Manganese substitutes in the structure also up to about three percent MnO. A high manganese content gives the crystals a rosy pink color. Lead, zinc, and cobalt also substitute in the structure for magnesium. The mineral dolomite is closely related to huntite .

Because dolomite can be dissolved by slightly acidic water, areas where dolomite is an abundant rock-forming mineral are important as aquifers and contribute to karst terrain formation.

Formation
Modern dolomite formation has been found to occur under anaerobic conditions in supersaturated saline lagoons such as those at the Rio de Janeiro coast of Brazil, namely, Lagoa Vermelha and Brejo do Espinho. There are many other localities where modern dolomite forms, notably along sabkhas in the Persian Gulf, but also in sedimentary basins bearing gas hydrates and hypersaline lakes. It is often thought that dolomite nucleates with the help of sulfate-reducing bacteria (e.g. Desulfovibrio brasiliensis), but other microbial metabolisms have been also found to mediate in dolomite formation. In general, low-temperature dolomite may occur in natural supersaturated environments rich in extracelullar polymeric substances (EPS) and microbial cell surfaces. This is likely result from complexation of  both magnesium and calcium by carboxylic acids comprising EPS.

Vast deposits of dolomite are present in the geological record, but the mineral is relatively rare in modern environments. Reproducible, inorganic low-temperature syntheses of dolomite are yet to be performed. Usually, the initial inorganic precipitation of a metastable "precursor" (such as magnesium calcite) can easily be achieved. The precursor phase will theoretically change gradually into a more stable phase (such as partially ordered dolomite) during periodical intervals of dissolution and re-precipitation. The general principle governing the course of this irreversible geochemical reaction has been coined "breaking Ostwald's step rule".  High diagenetic temperatures, such as those of groundwater flowing along deeply rooted fault systems affecting some sedimentary successions or deeply buried limestone rocks allocate dolomitization.  But the mineral is also volumetrically important in some Neogene platforms never subjected to elevated temperatures. Under such conditions of diagenesis the long-term activity of the deep biosphere could play a key role in dolomitization, since diagenetic fluids of contrasting composition are mixed as a response to Milankovitch cycles.

A recent biotic synthetic experiment claims to have precipitated ordered dolomite when anoxygenic photosynthesis proceeds in the presence of manganese(II). A still perplexing example of an organogenic origin is that of the reported formation of dolomite in the urinary bladder of a Dalmatian dog, possibly as the result of an illness or infection.

Uses
Dolomite is used as an ornamental stone, a concrete aggregate, and a source of magnesium oxide, as well as in the Pidgeon process for the production of magnesium. It is an important petroleum reservoir rock, and serves as the host rock for large strata-bound Mississippi Valley-Type (MVT) ore deposits of base metals such as lead, zinc, and copper. Where calcite limestone is uncommon or too costly, dolomite is sometimes used in its place as a flux for the smelting of iron and steel. Large quantities of processed dolomite are used in the production of float glass.

In horticulture, dolomite and dolomitic limestone are added to soils and soilless potting mixes as a pH buffer and as a magnesium source.

Dolomite is also used as the substrate in marine (saltwater) aquariums to help buffer changes in the pH of the water.

Calcined dolomite is also used as a catalyst for destruction of tar in the gasification of biomass at high temperature. Particle physics researchers like to build particle detectors under layers of dolomite to enable the detectors to detect the highest possible number of exotic particles. Because dolomite contains relatively minor quantities of radioactive materials, it can insulate against interference from cosmic rays without adding to background radiation levels.

In addition to being an industrial mineral, dolomite is highly valued by collectors and museums when it forms large, transparent crystals. The specimens that appear in the magnesite quarry exploited in Eugui, Esteribar, Navarra (Spain) are considered among the best in the world.

See also

References

External links 

Sedimentary rocks
Calcium minerals
Magnesium minerals
Carbonate minerals
Dolomite group
 
Trigonal minerals
Minerals in space group 148
Evaporite
Luminescent minerals
Industrial minerals